Peziza micropus is a species of apothecial fungus belonging to the family Pezizaceae. This European fungus is found on rotting wood, especially beech and elm and tends to thrive in the aftermath of outbreaks of Dutch elm disease.

References

External links

Peziza micropus at GBIF

Pezizaceae
Fungi described in 1800
Taxa named by Christiaan Hendrik Persoon